In modal logic, modal collapse is the condition in which every true statement is necessarily true, and vice versa; that is to say, there are no contingent truths, or to put it another way, that "everything exists necessarily".

In the context of philosophy, the term is commonly used in critiques of ontological arguments for the existence of God and the principle of divine simplicity. For example, Gödel's ontological proof contains  as a theorem, which combined with the axioms of system S5 leads to modal collapse.  Since some regard divine freedom as essential to the nature of God, and modal collapse as negating the concept of free will, this then leads to the breakdown of Gödel's argument.

References 

Modal logic
Philosophical logic
Theology